The Enemy Inside is the second album by Arctic Plateau, released in 2012 by Prophecy Records. The Artwork was done by Fursy Teyssier from Les Discrets.

Track listing

Personnel

 Gianluca Divirgilio - Music, lyrics
 Fursy Teyssier - artwork

References

2012 albums
Arctic Plateau albums